Abdoulaye Baldé may refer to:
Abdoulaye Baldé (footballer) (born 1986), French footballer
Abdoulaye Baldé (politician) (born 1964), Senegalese politician